Hearts on Fire is the second album from freestyle singer Noel Pagan, released in 1993 by Mercury Records. It contains the single, "Hearts on Fire", released on cassette and 12" vinyl. The album is also significant for showing the change in style of Noel, now with a pop rock album.

"Donna" is a cover of the Ritchie Valens song.

Tracks

References

1993 albums
Noel Pagan albums